Neil Patrick Emmott is a British Labour politician and leader of Rochdale Metropolitan Borough Council in Greater Manchester. As leader he is also a member of the Greater Manchester Combined Authority and is the combined authority's portfolio lead for the Green City Region and Waste and Recycling.

First elected to the council in 1986, he served on the council until 1994 before stepping down. He returned to politics in 2010 where he was elected to his current seat in the West Middleton ward, and was elected as leader of the council following the 2021 elections after challenging former leader Allen Brett for the leadership position.

References 

Living people
Labour Party (UK) councillors
Leaders of local authorities of England
Year of birth missing (living people)
Members of the Greater Manchester Combined Authority